The third season of Two and a Half Men originally aired between September 2005 and May 2006.

Production
The executive producers of the show for this season were the show's creators Chuck Lorre & Lee Aronsohn. The show's production companies were Chuck Lorre Productions, The Tannenbaum Company and Warner Bros. Television. The head writers for this season were Chuck Lorre and Lee Aronsohn. Other writers in this season were: Susan Beavers, Eddie Gorodetsky, Don Foster, Mark Roberts, Jeff Abugov and Jim Patterson. Gary Halvorson, Asaad Kelada, Rob Schiller, Jerry Zaks, Lee Aronsohn and James Widdoes were the directors for this season.

Cast

Main
 Charlie Sheen as Charlie Harper
 Jon Cryer as Alan Harper
 Angus T. Jones as Jake Harper
 Marin Hinkle as Judith Harper
 Conchata Ferrell as Berta
 Holland Taylor as Evelyn Harper

Recurring
 April Bowlby as Kandi
 Melanie Lynskey as Rose
 Emmanuelle Vaugier as Mia

Guest
 Sandra Purpuro as Mona
 Stephanie Erb as Mrs. Mindy Schmidt
 Natalie Zea as Colleen
 Jodi Lyn O'Keefe as Isabella
 Martin Sheen as Harvey
 June Squibb as Margaret
 Cloris Leachman as Norma
 Josie Davis as Sandy
 Jane Lynch as Dr. Linda Freeman
 J.D. Walsh as Gordon
 Jon Lovitz as Archie Baldwin
 Gail O'Grady as Mandi
 Kevin Sorbo as Andy
 Julia Campbell as Francine

Awards and nominations
This season of the series received seven Primetime Emmy Award nominations and received its first nomination for Outstanding Comedy Series, but lost to The Office. Charlie Sheen received his first Emmy nomination for Outstanding Lead Actor in a Comedy Series, while Jon Cryer received his first Emmy nomination for Outstanding Supporting Actor in a Comedy Series. Martin Sheen received a nomination for Outstanding Guest Actor in a Comedy Series for playing Rose's father, Harvey. Charlie Sheen also received a Golden Globe Award nomination for Best Performance by an Actor in a Television Series - Musical or Comedy. The show also received a nomination for the Producers Guild of America Award for Best Comedy Series. Angus T. Jones won a Young Artist Award for Best Performance in a TV Series (Comedy) - Supporting Actor.

Episodes

References

General references 
 
 
 

Season 3
2005 American television seasons
2006 American television seasons